Fell Foot Park is a country park, formerly the grounds of a Victorian house, situated beside Windermere, a lake in Cumbria, England, and in the ownership of the National Trust. It is just north of Newby Bridge on the A592 road in the civil parish of Staveley-in-Cartmel in South Lakeland district.

The estate was owned by Jeremiah Dixon, mayor of Leeds in 1784, who sold it in 1859 to Colonel G.J.M. Ridehalgh (1835-1892), a director of the North Lonsdale Iron and Steel Company, colonel of the 2nd Westmorland Volunteer Battalion Border Regiment and one of the founder members of the Royal Windermere Yacht Club. The house was demolished in 1907 to build a larger replacement, but the project was abandoned when the then owner died. The estate was given to the National Trust in 1948.

The manager's house (originally built as a gas works), several boathouses including one converted to a cafe, and a workshop and dock are Grade II listed buildings. They were constructed for Col. G.J.M. Ridehalgh. A local sailing and rowing club is located at the park and rowing boat and kayak hire is available during summer months. Other facilities include car parking, toilets, a gift shop and a playground.

Between March and September, Windermere Lake Cruises operate a passenger ferry service from Lakeside station to Fell Foot. At Lakeside, connection can be made to the same company's steamer service to Bowness-on-Windermere and the preserved Lakeside and Haverthwaite Railway.

The park's buildings were flooded during the 2015–16 Great Britain and Ireland floods.

A new watersports centre opened at the north end of the park in 2018. The park holds regular events, including a parkrun event every Saturday and the All England Open Stone Skimming Championships every August.

References

Further reading
 Note especially Appendix 1, Pages 36–38: "Fell Foot Park, Statement of Significance" for history of the estate.

External links

Fell Foot Park information at the National Trust
Illustrated guide to Fell Foot Park
 Includes links to many maps showing Fell Foot and a picture of the house

National Trust properties in the Lake District
Parks and open spaces in Cumbria
Furness
Staveley-in-Cartmel